Michael Dean Woodford (born 1955) is an American macroeconomist and monetary theorist who currently teaches at Columbia University.

Academic career
Woodford holds B.A. from the University of Chicago (1977) and a J.D. from Yale Law School (1980). He completed his Ph.D. in economics at MIT in 1983.

He began his teaching career at Columbia, and then taught at Chicago and Princeton before returning to Columbia to accept the John Bates Clark chair in 2004. He was awarded the John D. and Catherine T. MacArthur Foundation Prize Fellowship, which financed his research from 1981 to 1986. In 2007, he was awarded the Deutsche Bank Prize.

Theoretical contributions
Woodford's early research topics included sunspot equilibria, and imperfect competition. Thereafter he began to work on macroeconomic models with sticky prices; together with Julio Rotemberg he developed one of the first  microfounded New Keynesian macroeconomic models. Since then he has used this framework to study many topics related to monetary policy, including the fiscal theory of the price level, the effectiveness of monetary policy as consumers use more credit and less cash, and inflation targeting rules. Michael Woodford has especially praised Knut Wicksell's advocacy of using the interest rate to maintain price stability, noting that this was a remarkable insight at a time when most monetary policy was based on the gold standard (Woodford, 2003, p. 32). Woodford calls his own framework 'neo-Wicksellian', and he titled his textbook on monetary policy in homage to Wicksell's work.

Interest and Prices
Woodford is probably best known as the author of an advanced textbook on monetary macroeconomics entitled Interest and Prices: Foundations of a Theory of Monetary Policy. The book has, in the words of the Deutsche Bank Prize Committee, "quickly become the standard reference for monetary theory and analysis among academic economists and their colleagues at central banks." The title Interest and Prices is a direct translation of Geldzins und Güterpreise the title of a book published by Wicksell in German 1898 and translated into English 1923.

References

External links
 Michael Woodford's homepage at Columbia University
 Michael Woodford  2007 winner of the Deutsche Bank Prize in Financial Economics

1955 births
Living people
People from Chicopee, Massachusetts
Monetary economists
Columbia University faculty
MacArthur Fellows
MIT School of Humanities, Arts, and Social Sciences alumni
Princeton University faculty
University of Chicago alumni
University of Chicago faculty
Yale Law School alumni
Fellows of the Econometric Society
New Keynesian economists
Fellows of the American Academy of Arts and Sciences
20th-century American economists
21st-century American economists